Expedition 45 was the 45th expedition to the International Space Station. Scott Kelly and Mikhail Korniyenko transferred from Expedition 44 as part of their year-long stay aboard the ISS. Expedition 45 began with the arrival of Soyuz TMA-18M at the ISS on September 11, 2015, and concluded with the departure of Soyuz TMA-17M on December 11, 2015. Kelly, Korniyenko and Sergey Volkov then transferred to the crew of Expedition 46.

Crew

Source Spacefacts

See also

ISS year long mission

References

External links

 NASA's Space Station Expeditions page
 NASA, Space Station Partners Announce Future Crew Members

Expeditions to the International Space Station
2015 in spaceflight